A by-election was held on 22 November 1924 for one of the seats of the three-member electoral district of Barossa, South Australia. The cause for the by-election was the death of William Hague on 9 October 1924. Despite a field of seven candidates from three parties for three seats at the general election in March, only two candidates stood for the by-election in November. The result was that Henry Crosby for the Liberal Federation with 3732 votes defeated Michael Joseph Murphy for the Labor Party with 3063 votes.

Polling booths
The polling booths for the by-election were at: Gawler, Gawler South, Anna, Truro, Moculta, Two Wells, Virginia, Mount McKenzie, Salisbury, Stockwell, Angaston, Wasleys, Smithfield, Onetree Hill, Roseworthy, Lyndoch, Mallala, Williamstown, Loos, Tanunda, Cockatoo Valley, Dublin, Wildhorse Plains, Redbanks, Northfield, Abattoirs, Gilles Plains, Sedan, Nuriootpa, Keyneton, Punyelroo, Enfield, Blanchetown.

Dates
The writs were issued on 17 October 1924. Nominations closed on 28 October with polling day on 22 November.

Results

References

South Australian state by-elections
1924 elections in Australia
1920s in South Australia
November 1924 events